Rochev, female form Rocheva is a slavic surname.

Notable people with this surname include:
 Isabel Rochev, character in Arrow (TV series)
 Nikita Rochev, Belarusian footballer
 Nina Rocheva, Soviet skier
 Olga Rocheva, Russian skier
 Vasily Rochev (skier, born 1951), Soviet skier
 Vasily Rochev (skier, born 1980), Soviet skier

Russian-language surnames